This is a list of Spanish television related events from 2014.

Events
 7 February - MTV España becomes a Pay television service under satellite broadcasting platform Canal+.
 13 February - Intereconomía TV, owned by Intereconomía Corporation, becomes a Pay television, excluding Madrid and Valencia where it keeps broadcasting free-to-air.
 23 February - La Sexta broadcast the Pseudo-documentary Operación Palace, directed by Jordi Évole, about the 1981 Spanish coup d'état attempt, and becomes the most viewed non-sport show in the channel history, with 5,2 million views and 23,9% of share.
 2 March - La 1 broadcasts a documentary about rares diseases hosted by Isabel Gemio, with Crowdfunding aims, getting 1,2 Million euros.
 6 May - Spanish TV Channels Xplora, Nitro, La Sexta 3, LaSiete and Nueve close down after a Supreme Court of Spain warrant.
 25 September - Leopoldo González-Echenique resigns as Chairman of RTVE.
 23 October - José Antonio Sánchez Domínguez is appointed Chairman of RTVE.
 29 October - Julio Somoano is replaced by José Antonio Álvarez Gundín as Head of the News Department in Televisión Española.
 24 December - First Royal Christmas Message of the new King of Spain Felipe VI with 8,2 million views and 73,4% of share.

Debuts

Television shows

Ending this year

Changes of network affiliation

Deaths
 22 January - Manu Leguineche, writer and jorunalist, 72.
 6 February - Tatiana Sisquella, journalist, 35.
 24 February - Juan José Plans, writer and jorunalist, 70.
 28 February - Dunia Ayaso, director and writer, 53.
 2 April - Alfonso Bayard, actor, 47.
 3 April - Pere Ventura, actor, 54.
 21 April - Ramón Pons, actor, 73.
 6 June - Darío Barrio, chef and host, 42.
 4 July - Carmen Hornillos, hostess and journalist, 52.
 20 July - Álex Angulo, actor, 61.
 29 July - María Antonia Iglesias, journalist, 69.
 28 August - Roberto Cairo, actor, 51.
 2 September - Daniel Dicenta, actor, 76.
 3 September - Miguel Alcobendas, director, 74.
 2 October - Pedro Peña, actor, 88.
 4 October - Joan Molina, actor, 73.
 15 November - Emiliano Redondo, actor, 77.
 16 November - Josep Maria Bachs, host, 70.
 19 November - Koldo Losada, actor, 54.

See also
2014 in Spain
List of Spanish films of 2014

References